The 1997–1998 El Niño was regarded as one of the most powerful El Niño–Southern Oscillation events in recorded history, resulting in widespread droughts, flooding and other natural disasters across the globe. It caused an estimated 16% of the world's reef systems to die, and temporarily warmed air temperature by  compared to the usual increase of  associated with El Niño events.

It led to a severe outbreak of Rift Valley fever after extreme rainfall in north-eastern Kenya and southern Somalia. It also led to record rainfalls in California during the water season of 1997–98 and one of Indonesia's worst droughts on record. 1998 ultimately became the warmest year in recorded history (up until then).

Meteorological progression 

In January 1997, probes gathering information on deep water temperatures discovered an area of unusually warm water, centered around 150 meters depth, across the western half of the Pacific Ocean. By this time, the Scripps Institution of Oceanography had forecast that an ENSO was likely to take place during the latter half of 1997. Throughout February, water temperatures began increasing over much of the Pacific as well as in shallower waters off the coast of Peru. At the surface off the coast of Peru, water temperatures averaged 3 °C (5.4 °F) above normal.

Exceedingly warm waters became apparent by May, especially off the coast of South America where anomalies were reaching 7 °C (12.6 °F) above normal. Further north, sea surface temperatures along the Pacific coast of North America were increasing, with a large pool of water being 3 °C (5.4 °F) above normal. By September 1997, the ENSO became very powerful, with surface temperatures between South America and the International Dateline averaging 2-4 °C (3.6-7.2 °F) above normal, roughly a quarter of the planet's circumference. Additionally, the band of warmth along the Pacific coast of North America continued to expand, now stretching from Alaska to southern Mexico. Along the Pacific coast of the Americas, the volume of  water was roughly 30 times greater than that of all the water in the Great Lakes combined. The extra heat energy created by this anomaly was also about 93 times more than the energy produced by fossil fuels in the United States during 1995.

By January 1998, sea surface temperatures off the coast of Peru continued to increase, reaching 11 °C (19.8 °F) above average. However, the region of cooler than average water in the western Pacific expanded, signifying that a La Niña would take shape in the latter part of 1998. Just two months later, the extent of above-average water temperatures sharply decreased as the El Niño weakened. The 1997–98 ENSO event finally ended during May 1998 as below-average water temperatures extended across much of the Pacific.

Effects on tropical cyclone activity 
The 1997–98 El Niño Event had various effects on tropical cyclone activity around the world, with more tropical cyclones than average occurring in the Pacific basins. This included the Southern Pacific basin between 160°E and 120°W, where 16 tropical cyclones in the South Pacific were observed during the 1997–98 season compared to an average of around 8. The area where most of the tropical cyclones developed was shifted eastwards, with parts of the Cook Islands and French Polynesia impacted as a result. In the West Pacific basin, the season saw a record of 11 super typhoons, with 10 of them reaching Category 5 intensity. In the east Pacific basin, the 1997 season featured two Category 5 hurricanes, Guillermo and Linda, the latter of which was the strongest on record before Patricia took that title during the 2015 season. The North Pacific basin broke the record for having the most tropical cyclones reaching Category 4 and 5 intensities with 17 that season. However, the 2015 season surpassed it with 21 tropical cyclones during the 2014–16 El Niño event.

See also 
 El Niño
 1982–1983 El Niño event
 2014–2016 El Niño event
 1997 Pacific typhoon season
 1997 Pacific hurricane season
 1997 Atlantic hurricane season
 1997–98 South-West Indian Ocean cyclone season
 1997–98 Australian region cyclone season
 1997–98 South Pacific cyclone season
 1997 North Indian Ocean cyclone season
 1998 Pacific typhoon season

References 

El Nino 1997-98
El Nino 1997-98
1997-98